China Beach is an American war drama television series set at an evacuation hospital during the Vietnam War. The title refers to My Khe beach in the city of Đà Nẵng, Vietnam, nicknamed "China Beach" in English by American and Australian soldiers during the Vietnam War. The series originally ran on ABC  for four seasons from April 27, 1988 to July 22, 1991.

Overview
Created by William Broyles Jr. and John Sacret Young, the series looks at the Vietnam War from the perspectives of the women, military personnel and civilians who were present during the conflict. John Wells took over most of the series beginning with the second season and many of the show's cast members appeared later on another Wells production, ER.

Set at the fictitious 510th Evacuation Hospital and R&R facility (the "Five-and-Dime"), the series' cast of characters includes US Army doctors and nurses, officers, soldiers, Red Cross volunteers and civilian personnel (American, French, and Vietnamese). The series also features the experiences of the characters when they return to the United States, either on leave or at the end of their tours of duty. The show does not shy away from showing the brutality of war; it provides a gritty view of the experience and its aftermath.

The show was inspired in part by the book Home Before Morning (1983) written by the former U.S. Army Nurse Lynda Van Devanter. The show's character Nurse Colleen McMurphy roughly follows Van Devanter's experiences as a nurse in Vietnam. The book takes the reader from Van Devanter's wish to serve her country through the adventure she thought her deployment to Vietnam would be, her culture shock upon returning to "the States", and her struggles with PTSD. The show was cancelled before it could fully address McMurphy's PTSD issues. Van Devanter died in 2002.

Cast

 Dana Delany as First Lieutenant (later Captain) Colleen McMurphy, USA – a Catholic girl from Lawrence, Kansas, and army nurse with the 510th Evac Hospital in Vietnam during the late 1960s. A composite of various real-life Vietnam War nurses, the character illustrates their courage, kindness, and sacrifices during the war, as well as the severe emotional scarring of noncombatant personnel during and following military service; several episodes feature the veterans in their own words, intercut with the storyline. Delany won two Emmy awards for the role.
 Nan Woods as Cherry White (seasons 1–2) – a naive Red Cross volunteer ("doughnut dolly") from Iowa, she comes to China Beach to search for her brother Rick, a Marine Infantryman, who was reported MIA after the Battle of Khe Sanh. She dies midway through the second season during the Tet Offensive in January 1968.
 Michael Boatman as SP5 Samuel Beckett, USA – a draftee and a preacher's son from North Carolina, he works in the Graves Registration unit at China Beach. His job makes him unpopular with most of the other servicemen.
 Marg Helgenberger as Karen Charlene "K.C." Koloski – a cynical part-time prostitute and civilian volunteer, she comes to China Beach seeking to make her own wealth and fortune.
 Robert Picardo as Captain Dick Richard, USA – a head surgeon and womanizer dealing with being drafted into Army and away from his family, he worked as an OB-GYN when he was a civilian.
 Tim Ryan as Captain Bartholomew "Natch" Austen, USAF (regular in season 1; recurring in season 2) – a jet fighter pilot and McMurphy's love interest.
 Concetta Tomei as Major Lila Garreau, USA – a World War II veteran, she is the career Army commanding officer of China Beach.
 Brian Wimmer as Corporal Boonwell "Boonie" Lanier, USMC – the friendly China Beach lifeguard and manager of the Jet Set Club.
 Jeff Kober as Sergeant Evan "Dodger" Winslow, USMC – a moody Marine Force Reconnaissance operative, he serves and fights in the jungle mainly to keep other servicemen in his platoon alive. He constantly displays the "thousand-yard stare", a blank facial expression common among soldiers who have seen too much death and destruction in battle. He is a friend of Boonie, McMurphy, and Cherry.
 Chloe Webb as Laurette Barber (season 1) – a USO singer from Paoli, Pennsylvania, she is determined to make it big.
 Megan Gallagher as Airman Wayloo Marie Holmes, USAF (season 2) – a reporter for the Armed Services Network, she is seeking a career as a world-famous reporter.
 Nancy Giles as Private Franklin "Frankie" Bunsen, USA (seasons 2–4) – a female private, she was assigned to the China Beach motor pool.
 Ned Vaughn as Specialist Jeff Hyers, USA (season 3; guest appearances in seasons 2 and 4) – a good-natured combat medic from Georgia, he is killed in action midway through the third season during a routine patrol.
 Troy Evans as Sergeant First Class Bob Pepper, USA (seasons 3–4) – a World War II veteran, he is a driver, mechanic, and non-commissioned officer in charge of the motor pool. He becomes romantically involved with Lila Garreau, whom he later marries.
 Ricki Lake as Holly Pelegrino (season 3) – she is a sharp-witted Red Cross volunteer.
 guest role: Nancy Sinatra appeared in the first-season finale, re-creating USO concerts she performed for U.S. troops in 1966 and 1967.

Episodes

Over four seasons from 1988 to 1991, the series aired 61 episodes and one pilot movie.

Production
The title sequence theme song was "Reflections" by Diana Ross & the Supremes (the episode "Phoenix" instead used "We Gotta Get out of This Place" by Eric Burdon with Katrina & The Waves).

Reception
China Beach was a critically lauded, but poorly rated series. ABC persisted with the show for four seasons, but the final season was put on hiatus in fall 1990 and did not air its finale until July 22, 1991. As a result of the scheduling, Dana Delany was eligible for (and ultimately won) a Best Actress Emmy Award in the fall of 1992, a year after the series broadcast its final episode and over a year and a half after many of the scenes were filmed.

Awards and nominations

Syndication
China Beach debuted in rerun syndication on Lifetime, on November 4, 1991.

Home media
Before being released on DVD, the series' only home video release was the 97 minute pilot movie on Warner Home Video, in 1990 (cat no. 11971).

In December 2012, it was announced that the series, among the most-requested television shows not available through either VHS or DVD following its broadcast run, would be issued on DVD in a box set (including new interviews with cast members and various bonus features) and released on April 15, 2013, through StarVista Entertainment (affiliated with TimeLife). The collection includes 302 songs heard during the series. To mark the show's 25th anniversary, a 21-disc collector's set was released October 1, 2013.

Music rights long delayed the release on DVD. More than 250 songs were licensed; seventeen could not be, and were either deleted or replaced.

Possible follow-up novel
John Sacret Young stated prior to the show's October 2013 DVD release that he was working on a follow-up novel, titled Reflections, in which Colleen, now in her 60s and recently widowed, returned to Vietnam and reconnected with the retired Dick Richards and venture capitalist K.C. Koloski. Young had also hoped to adapt it into a TV movie. However, the novel was never published.

See also
Tour of Duty, a similar series also set in South Vietnam during the war

Further reading 

The show was inspired in part by a 1983 memoir by Lynda Van Devanter:

Two additional memoirs by medical personnel stationed at the actual China Beach:

Fiction:
The Healer's War, 1989 Nebula Award-winning novel of magical realism by Elizabeth Ann Scarborough, R.N, a five-year U.S. Army veteran, based upon her year at the actual China Beach.

References

External links

 
 Television Academy
 China Beach official site at Timelife.com

1980s American drama television series
1980s American medical television series
1988 American television series debuts
1990s American drama television series
1990s American medical television series
1991 American television series endings
American Broadcasting Company original programming
Best Drama Series Golden Globe winners
American military television series
American primetime television soap operas
English-language television shows
Peabody Award-winning television programs
Primetime Emmy Award-winning television series
Television series by Warner Bros. Television Studios
Television series about Vietnam War
Television series set in the 1960s
Television shows set in California
Television shows set in Hawaii
Television series based on actual events
Television series set in 1966
Television series set in 1967
Television series set in 1968
Television series set in 1969
Television series set in 1970
Television series set in 1972
Television series set in 1975
Television series set in 1976
Television series set in 1983
Television series set in 1985
Television series set in 1988